Music from the Motion Picture Juno is the soundtrack for the 2007 film Juno. The album compiles mostly indie rock songs from the 2000s, and was released by Rhino Entertainment on December 11, 2007. It received enough critical and commercial success that other compilations and expanded re-releases have been released in subsequent years.

Background
The album features several songs performed by Kimya Dawson and her bands Antsy Pants and the Moldy Peaches, due to a suggestion by lead actor Elliot Page:
At one point, I [director Jason Reitman] asked [Elliot] Page before we started shooting, 'What do you think Juno listens to?' And [he] said, 'The Moldy Peaches.' [He] went on my computer, played the songs, and I fell in love with it. [Screenwriter Diablo Cody] and I discussed putting a Moldy Peaches song in it where the characters would sing to each other. I got in touch with Kimya Dawson of The Moldy Peaches and she started sending me her work, which was beautiful, and that became a lot of the soundtrack.
Initially, Reitman conceived of the character being a fan of glam rock, but rejected it as too inauthentic. He replaced this by scoring the film with Yo La Tengo, but got into contact with Dawson after listening to "Anyone Else but You". Dawson insisted on seeing the screenplay before allowing her songs to be in the film, after which she agreed to send Reitman a package of her solo albums to review.

The Michael Cera/Elliot Page cover of "Anyone Else but You" was recorded on the last day of filming on the streets of Vancouver, British Columbia. During rehearsal, Dawson coached the duo on how to perform it and thought "'Aw, man, they sing it better than us.' They sing it so cute."

Track listing
 Barry Louis Polisar – "All I Want Is You" (2:37)
 Kimya Dawson – "My Rollercoaster" (0:53)
 The Kinks – "A Well Respected Man" (2:43)
 Buddy Holly – "(Ummm, Oh Yeah) Dearest" (1:53)
 Mateo Messina – "Up the Spout" (0:53)
 Kimya Dawson – "Tire Swing" (3:07)
 Belle & Sebastian – "Piazza, New York Catcher" (3:01)
 Kimya Dawson – "Loose Lips" (2:24)
 Sonic Youth – "Superstar" (4:06)
 Kimya Dawson – "Sleep" (0:53)
 Belle & Sebastian – "Expectations" (3:35)
 Mott the Hoople – "All the Young Dudes" (3:35)
 Kimya Dawson – "So Nice So Smart" (2:47)
 Cat Power – "Sea of Love" (2:23)
 Kimya Dawson and Antsy Pants – "Tree Hugger" (3:14)
 The Velvet Underground – "I'm Sticking with You" (2:29)
 The Moldy Peaches – "Anyone Else but You" (2:59)
 Antsy Pants – "Vampire" (1:20)
 Michael Cera and Elliot Page – "Anyone Else but You" (1:56)

Songs used in the film and promotion
The following songs appear in the film, but are not present on the soundtrack album:
 Kimya Dawson – "I Like Giants"
 Kimya Dawson – "Reminders of Then"
 Kimya Dawson – "12/26"
 The Drop. – "Why Bother"
 Heart – "Crazy on You"
 Hole – "Doll Parts"
The songs "Once I Loved" by Astrud Gilberto and "Besame Mucho" by Trio Los Panchos were included in the film, but not on the main soundtrack. Both selections would later appear on Juno B-Sides: Almost Adopted Songs.

In addition to some incidental score, the following were used in the trailers for the film, but do not appear on the soundtrack or in the movie itself:
 The Boy Least Likely To – "Be Gentle with Me"
 The Hoosiers – "Goodbye Mr A"
 Boy Kill Boy – "Suzie"
 Belle & Sebastian – "She's Losing It"
 Oh No! Oh My! – "The Party Punch" (used in marketing for the DVD release)
 The White Stripes – "We're Going to Be Friends"

Critical reception and sales chart performance

The soundtrack debuted at number eight on the American Billboard 200 after its first week of release, climbing to number three and number two in the following weeks. In the issue dated February 9, 2008, the album hit number one, with 65,000 copies sold. After being number 1 for one week, it dropped to number 2. The album has since become a platinum record in the U.S. selling over 1,000,000 copies.

It is the first soundtrack to top the albums chart in the U.S. since the High School Musical 2 soundtrack the prior September, and the first number-one album for the Rhino label. It was the first number one soundtrack for a 20th Century Fox movie since Titanic in 1997.

Juno B-Sides: Almost Adopted Songs

On April 8, 2008, a second soundtrack was released exclusively through the iTunes Store called Juno B-Sides: Almost Adopted Songs. It contains songs that were originally slated for the film, including a version of the 20th Century Fox Fanfare by Kimya Dawson and Mateo Messina originally planned to be used before "The Simpsons beat [them] to it" (referring to how The Simpsons Movie begins with Ralph Wiggum singing along with the fanfare) and a song sung by Juno (Elliot Page) in a deleted scene from the movie. It was released to other digital music providers on May 13, 2008, and was available as disc two of the deluxe edition soundtrack on November 18, 2008.

 Kimya Dawson – "Twentieth Century Fox Fanfare" (0:20)
 Barry Louis Polisar – "Me and You" (2:16)
 Belle & Sebastian – "My Wandering Days Are Over" (5:24)
 Mateo Messina – "Go Fly a Kite" (0:49)
 Kimya Dawson – "Viva la Persistence" (3:47)
 The Bristols – "Little Baby" (2:16)
 Jr. James & The Late Guitar – "I'm into Something Good" (3:27)
 Mateo Messina – "Meet the MacGuffs" (0:54)
 Astrud Gilberto – "Once I Loved" (2:13)
 Kimya Dawson – "All I Want Is You" (2:31)
 Buddy Holly – "Learning the Game" (2:02)
 Mateo Messina – "The Lorings" (1:25)
 Trio Los Panchos – "Bésame Mucho" (3:01)
 Yo La Tengo – "You Can Have It All" (4:36)
 Elliot Page – "Zub Zub" (1:09)

Deluxe Edition Soundtrack
Rhino Records released a two-disc deluxe edition of the Juno soundtrack on November 18, 2008, which contains all tracks from the original soundtrack, as well as the material available currently on B-Sides. This version has a modified cover with green stripes instead of orange.

Juno's Mix CD
Initial DVD copies of the film purchased at Wal-Mart came with a sampler CD entitled Juno's Mix CD. It contains material found on Juno B-Sides: Almost Adopted Songs and one B-Side exclusive.

 Mateo Messina – "Meet the MacGuffs"
 Astrud Gilberto – "Once I Loved"
 Mateo Messina – "Loring Bathroom" (Exclusive to this CD)
 Belle & Sebastian – "My Wandering Days Are Over"
 Mateo Messina – "Meet the Lorings" (Found on Juno B-Sides: Almost Adopted Songs under the title "The Lorings")

Production personnel
 Peter Afterman – production
 Danielle Bond – soundtrack director
 Reggie Collins – project assistant
 Amy Driscoll – supervisor
 Nikki Fair – project assistant
 Dan Hersch – mastering
 Robert Kraft – executive
 Alison Litton – coordination
 Joshua Petker – art supervisor
 Jason Reitman – production, liner notes
 Liuba Shapiro – product manager
 Garrett Smith – art direction
 Margaret Yen – production

Charts

Weekly charts

Year-end charts

Certifications

Release history

Notes

References

External links
 Rhino Records press release for the soundtrack
 Juno Soundtrack at imeem.com
 Juno soundtrack at the soundtrackINFO project
 Interview with Mateo Messina, who scored the film

Comedy-drama film soundtracks
2007 soundtrack albums
2007 compilation albums
Indie rock soundtracks
Indie rock compilation albums
Grammy Award for Best Compilation Soundtrack for Visual Media
Rhino Entertainment soundtracks
Rhino Entertainment compilation albums

fr:Juno (film)#Bande originale